This was a new event on the ITF Women's Circuit in 2011.

Hsieh Su-wei won the tournament, defeating Yurika Sema in the final, 6–1, 6–0.

Seeds

Main draw

Finals

Top half

Bottom half

References 
 Main draw

Samsung Securities Cup - Women's Singles
2011 Women's Singles